Zirconium(III) chloride is an inorganic compound with formula ZrCl3. It is a blue-black solid that is highly sensitive to air.

Preparation
The material was first claimed by Ruff and Wallstein who reduced zirconium tetrachloride with aluminium to give impure samples. Subsequently, the problem with aluminium contamination was solved when it was prepared by reduction using zirconium metal:
Zr + 3 ZrCl4 → 4 ZrCl3

When aluminium is used as the reducing agent with zirconium tetrachloride, a series of choloroaluminates are formed, for example [Zr(AlCl4)2(AlCl4)2] and Zr(AlCl4)3.

Since the trihalides, such as zirconium trichloride, are comparatively nonvolatile, contamination can be avoided by using a gaseous reductant. For example, zirconium trichloride can be prepared by reduction of zirconium tetrachloride with hydrogen.
ZrCl4 + ½ H2 → ZrCl3 + HCl

Structure
Some zirconium halides (ZrCl3, ZrBr3, and ZrI3) have structures similar to HfI3. They also have similar space group (P63/mcm) and hexagonal structure with 2 molecules in the cell. The magnetic susceptibility of zirconium trichloride suggests metal-metal interactions of the unpaired electron on each Zr(III) center. The magnetic moment of ZrCl3 (0.4 BM) indicates considerable overlap of metal orbitals.

References

Zirconium(III) compounds
Chlorides
Metal halides